

D

References

Lists of words